The Sandavágur stone (FR 2 M) is a runestone that was discovered in the town of Sandavágur on the Faroe Islands in 1917. The stone can today be seen in the Sandavágur Church.

The inscription describes Þorkell, a man from Rogaland, Norway who claims to have lived in the Sandavágur area first. He is presumably one of the first settlers, if not the very first one. In both runes and language the Sandavágur stone corresponds to what is known from Rogaland around the 13th century.

See also
Fámjin stone
Kirkjubøur stone

References 

Runestones on the Faroe Islands